The Ultra-Leicht Flugtechnik Speedy Mouse is a German ultralight aircraft, designed and produced by Ultra-Leicht Flugtechnik of Braunschweig. The aircraft is supplied as a complete ready-to-fly-aircraft.

Design and development
The aircraft was derived from the FMP Qualt 200 and designed to comply with the Fédération Aéronautique Internationale microlight rules. It features a cantilever low-wing, a T-tail, a two-seats-in-side-by-side configuration enclosed cockpit under a front-hinged bubble canopy, fixed conventional landing gear and a single engine in tractor configuration.

The Speedy Mouse is made from mixed wood and epoxy construction. The wings can be quickly removed for ground transport or storage. The standard engine is the  Rotax 912ULS four-stroke powerplant. The aircraft was designed for aero-towing gliders.

Specifications (Speedy Mouse)

References

External links

Photo of the Ultra-Leicht Flugtechnik Speedy Mouse
Photo of the Ultra-Leicht Flugtechnik Speedy Mouse

2010s German ultralight aircraft
Single-engined tractor aircraft